Mordellistena intersecta is a beetle in the genus Mordellistena of the family Mordellidae. It was described in 1876 by Emery.

References

intersecta
Beetles described in 1876